The 2007 Champ Car Generac Grand Prix at Road America was the tenth round of the 2007 Champ Car World Series Season. It was held on August 12 at Road America in Elkhart Lake, Wisconsin.

Qualifying results

Sébastien Bourdais, fresh off signing his name to a 2008 contract with Formula 1's Scuderia Toro Rosso, dominated both qualifying sessions, finishing Saturday with a best lap a second and a half clear of his closest competitor.  Will Power was best of the rest to secure the other front row starting spot next to Bourdais on Sunday.

Race

After dominating qualifying, Sébastien Bourdais led away from the starting grid.  Will Power, the other front row starter, dropped back with bad handling while Robert Doornbos was able to provide Bourdais a certain amount of pressure after starting third on the grid, staying within two seconds of the Frenchman.

Unfortunately for Doornbos the set of tires he switched to after his first pit stop did not prove to his liking and he began losing large chunks of time as Bourdais continued in the lead.

Meanwhile, Doornbos' teammate Dan Clarke was putting on a show.  Slow away from the grid thanks to a bad clutch, Clarke took advantage of the yellow flag on the opening lap by pitting and setting off an alternate strategy.  When the rest of the field pitted on lap 14, Clarke found himself in the lead and made the most of the open track in front of him and came out in second place in front of Doornbos and Graham Rahal after he emerged from his pit stop on lap 16.

With Doornbos struggling on his tires, Rahal got around Doornbos in turn 3 on lap 24.  Doornbos' race then went completely wrong on the next lap as Clarke cut in front of him on the approach to turn 5.  Doornbos' front wing was knocked off and his suspension was damaged.  He was forced to limp back to the pits, his race ruined, though he was able to return to the fight albeit four laps down.  Clarke was apologetic after the race, but Doornbos accused the Englishman of brake checking him.

Clarke got around Rahal after his second pit stop, gaining further benefit from his alternate pit stop strategy while Bourdais continued to easily lead the field.  The race would finish up in that order.  Surprisingly, the win was the first for Bourdais in four attempts at the scenic Wisconsin circuit.  With Will Power ending up in 16th place with a broken gearbox, Doornbos' accident-marred 14th-place finish and Justin Wilson, best amongst the rest of the point challengers managing only an eighth place, Bourdais took a stranglehold on the season championship.

This race marked the final race on US soil for the Champ Car Series as a separate entity from the IndyCar Series, before the merger of the two in early 2008.

Caution flags

Notes

 New Race Record Sébastien Bourdais :  1:40:58.596
 Average Speed 127.481 mph

Championship standings after the race

Drivers' Championship standings

 Note: Only the top five positions are included.

Attendance
Attendance at the 2007 Generac Grand Prix was over 100,000 people during the 4 day race weekend. Race coordinators were pleased with this result as this was the highest attendance the race had garnered since the heyday of CART racing in the late 1980s and early 1990s.

References

External links
 Full Weekend Times & Results
 Race Box Score
 Drivers Standings After Race

Generac Grand Prix, 2007
Generac Grand Prix
Champ Car Grand Prix of Road America